David Bruce Shear (born May 25, 1954) is an American diplomat who was a career Foreign Service Officer. Shear served as the Assistant Secretary of Defense for Asian and Pacific Security Affairs from July 2014 to June 2016. Prior to his nomination for this position, he served as United States Ambassador to Vietnam.  He was also formerly deputy assistant secretary for East Asian and Pacific affairs at the U.S. Department of State; he joined the State Department in 1982 and has served in Washington, Sapporo, Beijing, Kuala Lumpur and Tokyo.

Born in Cobleskill, New York, Shear attended Clayton A. Bouton High School, graduating in 1971. He is a graduate of Earlham College with a B.A. degree in 1975. Shear also has a M.A. degree in international affairs from the Johns Hopkins School of Advanced International Studies in 1982, and was a Rusk Fellow at Georgetown University's Institute for the Study of Diplomacy. He served as United States Ambassador to Vietnam from 2011 until leaving office in 2014.

Personal life
Shear is a black belt in kendo. He and his wife Barbara have a daughter. He speaks Chinese and Japanese.

References

External links

1954 births
Living people
People from Cobleskill, New York
Earlham College alumni
Paul H. Nitze School of Advanced International Studies alumni
United States Foreign Service personnel
Georgetown University alumni
Ambassadors of the United States to Vietnam
United States Assistant Secretaries of Defense
American kendoka